Chinese chestnut may refer to:

Trees
Castanea mollissima, native to China, Taiwan, and Korea
Sterculia monosperma

Fruits
Eleocharis dulcis
Water caltrop (Trapa natans)

See also
Water chestnut
Chestnut (disambiguation)